ER is an American drama series that aired on NBC from September 19, 1994, until April 2, 2009. The series featured a large ensemble cast that changed dramatically over its long run. The main cast was augmented by a wealth of recurring characters and award-winning guest stars.

Main cast
The original starring cast consisted of Anthony Edwards as Dr. Mark Greene, George Clooney as Dr. Douglas "Doug" Ross, Sherry Stringfield as Dr. Susan Lewis, Noah Wyle as medical student (later Dr.) John Carter, and Eriq La Salle as Dr. Peter Benton. Julianna Margulies guest starred in the pilot as Nurse Carol Hathaway before becoming part of the regular cast.

The first additions to the main cast came in Season 2 with Gloria Reuben signing on as Physician Assistant Jeanie Boulet (recurring character in Season 1), and in Season 3 with Laura Innes as Dr. Kerry Weaver (recurring character in Season 2). In Season 4, Maria Bello signed on as Dr. Anna Del Amico (recurring character at the end of Season 3) and Alex Kingston joined the cast as Dr. Elizabeth Corday. Season 5 saw the addition of Kellie Martin as medical student Lucy Knight.

George Clooney's departure towards the end of Season 5 started a major cycle of main cast changes over the next few years. Season 6 opened with the addition of Paul McCrane as Dr. Robert "Rocket" Romano (recurring character in both Seasons 4 and 5), Croatian actor Goran Visnjic as Dr. Luka Kovač, and Michael Michele as Dr. Cleo Finch. A bit later in the season Erik Palladino joined as Dr. Dave Malucci, and Ming-Na returned to the series as Dr. Jing-Mei "Deb" Chen, reprising a recurring character she portrayed in Season 1. Soon after, Maura Tierney was added as Nurse (later Dr.) Abigail "Abby" Lockhart. Season 8 saw the arrival of Sharif Atkins as medical student (later Dr.) Michael Gallant, as well as the return of Dr. Susan Lewis when Sherry Stringfield reprised her role after having left the series in Season 3.

Mekhi Phifer joined the cast in Season 9 as Dr. Gregory "Greg" Pratt (recurring character at the end of Season 8). Season 10 saw the addition of Parminder Nagra as medical student (later Dr.) Neela Rasgotra and Linda Cardellini as Samantha "Sam" Taggart. Shane West joined the cast in Season 11 as Ray Barnett and Scott Grimes became part of the main cast in Season 12 as Dr. Archie Morris (recurring character in Seasons 10 and 11). Season 13 saw the addition of John Stamos as Dr. Tony Gates, reprising a role he had originated in Season 12 when he portrayed Gates the paramedic/medical student. Season 15 saw the final additions to the main cast, with David Lyons signing on as Dr. Simon Brenner (recurring character towards the end of Season 14) and Angela Bassett as Dr. Catherine "Cate" Banfield.

Notably, of the 26 main cast members that starred throughout ERs 15-season run, only seven were not featured in the final season: Gloria Reuben, Maria Bello, Kellie Martin, Michael Michele, Erik Palladino, Ming-Na, and Sharif Atkins. In addition, only four main cast members never made a return appearance of any type following their original stint: Maria Bello, Kellie Martin, Erik Palladino, and Mekhi Phifer.

Main characters

Timeline of County General Staff

Departures from the main cast
Sherry Stringfield's first departure from the show was in 1996, when her character, Susan Lewis, moved to Phoenix, Arizona, in the Season 3 episode "Union Station." In 2001, Stringfield returned to the series, reprising her role of Dr. Lewis, in the Season 8 episode "Never Say Never." She departed again after the Season 12 premiere, "Canon City." This departure was not depicted, but was mentioned by character Kerry Weaver two episodes later, in "Man With No Name", as not coming in due to interviewing for a tenured position, having been denied tenure at County, and again later in "Wake Up," when Weaver explains that Susan accepted a tenure-track position at a hospital in Iowa City, Iowa. Stringfield returned once again for the series finale.

After playing Anna Del Amico for one season, Maria Bello was not part of the ensemble cast when Season 5 began. Like Susan Lewis's second exit, her character's departure was mentioned but not depicted: in the season premiere, "Day for Knight," Carter explains to new medical student Lucy Knight that the locker she is inheriting previously belonged to Anna Del Amico, who is working in a pediatric ER in Philadelphia, where she has family and a boyfriend.

George Clooney left the show in the Season 5 episode "The Storm, Part 2," when his character, Doug Ross, quit before being fired for his involvement in a patient's death. Clooney made a cameo appearance in the Season 6 episode "Such Sweet Sorrow" when his character reunited with Carol Hathaway and appeared in the Season 15 episode "Old Times" where his character was the attending physician caring for a terminal organ donor.

Gloria Reuben departed early in Season 6, in the episode "The Peace of Wild Things," when her character, Jeanie Boulet, decided to become a stay-at-home mom and care for her newly adopted HIV-positive baby. Reuben returned with her child in the Season 14 episode "Status Quo".

Kellie Martin, who played medical student Lucy Knight, left the series midway through Season 6 in the episode "All In The Family," when her character was killed by a patient with undiagnosed schizophrenia; his psychotic break occurred before a backed-up psychiatry department could arrive in the ER for a consult.

Julianna Margulies left the show at the end of Season 6, in the episode "Such Sweet Sorrow," when her character, Carol Hathaway, decided on the spur of the moment to go to Seattle, Washington, and reunite with Doug Ross, her true love and the father of her twin daughters. Margulies returned in the Season 15 episode "Old Times," with her character coordinating transplant efforts from a single organ donor.

Erik Palladino departed early in Season 8, in the episode "Never Say Never," after his character, Dave Malucci, was fired for inappropriate conduct.

Eriq La Salle's character, Peter Benton, departed in the Season 8 episode "I'll Be Home For Christmas." He took a job with a set schedule at another hospital in order to spend more time with his son, Reese, and his girlfriend, former fellow ER doctor Cleo Finch. La Salle returned for two more episodes in Season 8 and then again for two episodes in Season 15, including the series finale.

Michael Michele's character, Cleo Finch, departed in the Season 8 episode "I'll Be Home For Christmas" with her boyfriend, and fellow doctor, Peter Benton, after having previously taken a job at the same hospital (in fact it was she who arranged the interview which resulted in Benton's job offer). Michele made a cameo appearance in the Season 8 episode "On the Beach" at Mark Greene's funeral.

Anthony Edwards's character, Mark Greene, died of a brain tumor in Season 8's penultimate episode, "On the Beach." Unusually, Anthony Edwards was credited in the following episode "Lockdown." Edwards returned in the Season 15 episode "Heal Thyself" where he appeared in multiple flashback scenes to give insight into the past of Angela Bassett's character.

Paul McCrane's character, Robert Romano, whose arm had been severed just above the elbow by a helicopter's tail rotor in the Season 9 premiere "Chaos Theory, died in the Season 10 episode "Freefall." A helicopter that was taking off from the hospital roof was buffeted by strong winds, causing it to crash on the roof and plummet over the side of the building; it fell into a crowded ambulance bay and landed squarely on Romano. McCrane returned in the Season 15 episode "Heal Thyself" in a cameo during flashbacks.

Sharif Atkins left the series in the Season 10 episode "Where There's Smoke," when his character, Michael Gallant, revealed that the Army was sending him to Iraq. Atkins returned for two episodes during Season 11 where he is seen serving duty in Iraq and then for four episodes during Season 12 when he marries Neela Rasgotra and then returns to Iraq where he is killed by an improvised explosive device while serving a second tour.

Alex Kingston's character, Elizabeth Corday, departed early in Season 11 in the episode "Fear" after getting in trouble for performing an illegal organ donation procedure; rather than being summarily fired, County offered her a demotion to a non-tenured position, but she turned it down and opted to return to England instead. In an interview with Britain's Radio Times magazine, Kingston spoke of being written off the show due to her age, a statement that sparked some controversy. She later withdrew that claim. Kingston returned for two episodes in Season 15, including the series finale.

Ming-Na departed midway through Season 11 in the episode "Twas The Night" when her character, Jing-Mei Chen, resigned in order to take care of her ailing father, whom she later euthanized. This was the second time her character left County General: in Season 1, medical student "Deb" Chen appeared in an eight episode story arc which concluded with her leaving medical school after accidentally leaving a guide wire in a patient's chest, deciding she was better suited to research than to applied medicine.

Noah Wyle left in the Season 11 finale, "The Show Must Go On." His character, John Carter, having received tenure at County, decided to reunite with his girlfriend Kem Likasu (portrayed by Thandie Newton). Wyle returned for four episodes during Season 12 where he is seen practicing medicine in Darfur and then for five episodes during Season 15 when he needs a kidney transplant.

Laura Innes left midway through Season 13 in the episode "A House Divided," when a reluctant Luka Kovač was forced by budget cuts to fire her character, Kerry Weaver. After bracing for a battle to keep her position, and in spite of the fact that Kovač realized he must find a way to keep her on staff, Weaver ultimately decided to resign from County and accept a job offer from a television station in Miami, Florida. Innes returned for two episodes in Season 15, including the series finale.

Shane West left in the Season 13 finale, "The Honeymoon is Over," after his character, Ray Barnett got hit by a truck, lost both his legs and returned to Baton Rouge with his mother to recuperate. West returned for three episodes during Season 15 when his character reunited with Neela Rasgotra.

Goran Visnjic, who played the character of Luka Kovač, departed in the season finale of Season 13 when he left for Croatia to care for his ailing father. He returned for seven episodes in Season 14 to wrap up his medical storyline and then made a brief appearance in Season 15's "Book of Abby" where he, Abby, and their son Joe embark on their new life together.

Mekhi Phifer departed in the Season 15 premiere when his character, Gregory Pratt, died in the ER as the result of blast injuries suffered in an ambulance explosion in the Season 14 finale.

Maura Tierney, who played the character of Abby Lockhart, departed early in Season 15 in the episode "Book of Abby" with her TV husband Luka Kovač. Along with their son Joe, they presumably headed to Boston, where Abby had accepted a new job. She attempted to leave the ER quietly, however the rest of the staff made it known how much they would miss her. Nurse Haleh Adams showed Abby a hidden wall with the locker labels of all the past staff members since season one, with the exceptions of Carter (who refused to deface government property) and Boulet (who took hers as a memento when she departed in Season 6). Other names on the wall include departed former characters as well as some prominent writers and producers. Abby then left the ER and met Luka and her son Joe outside to embark on their new life together. Tierney returned in the Season 15 episode "Shifting Equilibrium" in a cameo during a phone conversation with Neela Rasgotra.

Supporting cast

Desk clerks and other non-medical hospital staff

Family members and friends

Fire fighters, paramedics, police officers, and social workers

Notable patients

Others

Secondary doctors and medical students

Nurses and other medical staff

Guest stars

Notable guest stars
 Ed Asner in 2003, as Dr. James McNulty, who runs a street clinic
 Kat Dennings in 2006, as Zoe Butler, a victim of parental battering
 Kirsten Dunst in 1996, as Charlie Chemingo, a child prostitute
 Zac Efron in 2003, as Bobby Neville, a gunshot victim
 Lucy Liu in 1995, as Mei-Sun Leow, the mother of a child dying of AIDS
 Chris Pine in 2003, as Levine, a drunk teen patient
 Charlotte Rae in 2008, as Roxanne Gaines
 Susan Sarandon in 2009, as Nora, a grandmother being asked to consent to the donation of her grandchild's organs
 Eric Stonestreet in 2000, as Willie, a man who tried to make his ears look Vulcan
 Charles Tyner in 1999, as Barry Connelly, whose wife hesitates to sign a DNR
 Wallace Shawn in 2009, as Teddy Lempell, whose love potion may have worked with Jerry
 Judy Greer in 2009, as Tildie Mulligan, who drove her car into the lake because the GPS told her to go straight
 Diego Klattenhoff in 2009, as Jay, the best friend of patient, Mr. Walter's, late son.
 Michael Reilly Burke in 2009, as Dick White, the father that provided vodka at his teenage daughter's slumber party
 Brian Haley in 2009, as Chris Salamunovich, the husband of the woman having twins
 Marilu Henner in 2009, as Linda, the obnoxious mother in law who fought with her son's bride at the wedding
Eva Mendes in 1998, as Donna, a babysitter concerned with the well-being of the girl she's caring for

Emmy Award recognized guest stars

Guest stars whose performances won Emmys are:
 Sally Field in 2001, as Maggie Wyczenski, Abby Lockhart's mother.
 Ray Liotta in 2005, as Charlie Metcalf, a regret-ridden, dying alcoholic.
Guest stars whose performances earned Emmy nominations include:
 Rosemary Clooney in 1995, as "Madame X", an Alzheimer's patient.
 Penny Fuller in 1996, as Mrs. Constantine.
 William H. Macy in 1997, as Dr. David Morgenstern.
 Ewan McGregor in 1997, as Duncan Stewart, a convenience store gunman.
 Veronica Cartwright in 1997, as Norma.
 Swoosie Kurtz in 1998, as Tina-Marie Chambliss.
 Alan Alda in 2000, as Dr. Gabriel Lawrence, an Alzheimer's-stricken doctor and one-time teacher of Dr. Kerry Weaver.
 James Cromwell in 2001, as Bishop Stewart, an ailing Roman Catholic bishop who coaxes a confession from Dr. Luka Kovač, before dying from lupus.
 Mary McDonnell in 2002, as Eleanor Carter, the mother of Dr. John Carter.
 Don Cheadle in 2003, as Paul Nathan, a medical student with Parkinson's disease.
 Bob Newhart in 2004, as Ben Hollander, an architecture model maker losing his sight.
 Red Buttons in 1995, 1996, and 2005, as Mr. Jules "Ruby" Rubadoux.
 James Woods in 2006, as Dr. Nate Lennox a patient with ALS and former teacher of many of the ER doctors.
 Forest Whitaker in 2007, as Curtis Ames, a patient filing a lawsuit against Dr. Luka Kovač.
 Stanley Tucci in 2008, as Dr. Kevin Moretti.
 Ernest Borgnine in 2009, as Paul Manning

References

ER (TV series)
Lists of actors by American television series
Lists of actors by drama television series